20 cents is a coinage value in some systems using decimal currencies. While some countries use a 20-cent coin, some countries use a 25-cent coin instead of a 20-cent coin.

Examples include:
 Australian 20 cent coin
 New Zealand twenty-cent coin
 20 cent euro coin
 Hong Kong twenty-cent coin

See also
 Cent (currency)
 :Category:Twenty-cent coins